"Pretty Vegas" is a song by Australian rock band INXS. It was released in September 2005 as the lead single from their 11th studio album, Switch, and the first with new Canadian lead singer J.D. Fortune, winner of the Rock Star: INXS competition.

Release
"Pretty Vegas" was first released exclusively through the iTunes Store on 19 September 2005. A video for the song was released on the same day. The song debuted on the show Rock Star: INXS during the time when Fortune was vying for the lead vocalist spot in INXS. The eight contestants were challenged to write lyrics to a melody written by Andrew Farriss. They were divided into two teams of four. When Fortune did not see eye to eye with his team (which included runner-up Marty Casey), he decided to venture out on his own and write his own lyrics.

Chart performance
The song peaked at number 37 on the US Billboard Hot 100 singles chart on 22 October 2005, an achievement that made the band one of a very select few from the 1980s to have a top-40 hit with a new song in the 21st century. After the release of INXS' album Switch, the single reached number seven on the Billboard Hot Adult Top 40 Tracks chart. The single was also somewhat of a comeback song in Australia, becoming their first ARIA top 10 single in 14 years, peaking at number nine.

The song was certified gold by the Recording Industry Association of America (RIAA) on 26 January 2006. The single was also certified gold by Music Canada on 8 March 2006 for sales of over 10,000 digital copies.

Track listings
Australian maxi-single
 "Pretty Vegas" (album version) – 3:27
 "Pretty Vegas" (live) – 4:17

Digital download
 "Pretty Vegas" – 3:26

Charts

Weekly charts

Year-end charts

Certifications

Release history

References

2005 songs
2005 singles
INXS songs
Epic Records singles
Song recordings produced by Guy Chambers
Songs written by Andrew Farriss
Songs written by J.D. Fortune